Calliandra peninsularis is a species of flowering plants of the genus Calliandra in the family Fabaceae. It is endemic to Baja California Sur state in Mexico.

References

peninsularis
Endemic flora of Mexico
Flora of Baja California Sur